Marjorie K. Eastman (born 1979) is an author, advocate, and U.S. Army combat veteran of Operation Iraqi Freedom and Operation Enduring Freedom. Her memoir The Frontline Generation: How We Served Post 9/11 discusses post–9/11 service and leadership. The book received a 2017 Independent Publishers National Book Award and is on the recommended reading list for the U.S. Army Military Intelligence Center of Excellence Library and Museum.  In 2019, Eastman was selected by The Junior Chamber International (JCI) USA as a recipient of the 2019 Ten Outstanding Young Americans Award. She was a candidate for the Republican nomination for the 2022 U.S Senate election in North Carolina.

Early life
Eastman earned her bachelor's degree in Political Science from the University of California, San Diego. As an undergraduate, she was competitively selected for a White House Internship in 2000 and also studied abroad at the University College London, School for Slavonic and East European Studies. She attended the Josef Korbel School of International Studies at the University of Denver, where she earned her master's degree in International Security, with concentrations in Homeland Security, Intelligence, and Human Rights. During her graduate studies, she was one of 56 students selected nationally for the Federal Bureau of Investigation's Honors Internship Program. She also has an MBA from Vanderbilt University's Owen Graduate School of Management.

Career
Eastman has been described as a veteran thought leader in PBS's Veterans Coming Home Initiative. In 2018, Eastman was selected as one of the nation's Top 25 Influencers Supporting to the Military Community, known as Mighty 25.

In September 2019, she spoke at a Chapman University panel with other distinguished veteran leaders about the impact of decades of war on American society.

During the election of 2020, she advocated to ensure every military absentee ballot was counted as the organizer for Count Every Hero.

Writings
Marjorie is an author of the 2017 National Independent Publisher Book Award (IPPY) for, The Frontline Generation: How We Served Post 9/11. It was a featured title for Hudson Booksellers in airports across the U.S. (2016-2017) and is on the recommended reading list for the U.S. Army Military Intelligence Center of Excellence library and museum.

Eastman's experience as a female veteran was profiled on the Nashville Public Television feature Veterans Coming Home in 2016. Her opinion pieces on veterans and the post 9/11 generation of leaders and service have been published in local, regional and national media outlets, including The Washington Post, USA Today, CNN., The Houston Chronicle coauthored with General Peter Chiarelli, Task & Purpose, Military.com, Forbes, The Foreign Policy Magazine, C-SPAN, and NPR have also featured her work.

Political career 
On October 5, 2021, Eastman announced her candidacy for the Republican nomination for the 2022 United States Senate Election in North Carolina. In her announcement, she attacked the withdrawal from Afghanistan and pledged to only serve for two terms.

References

External links
 
 Excerpt of The Frontline Generation at Foreign Policy Magazine

1979 births
Living people
21st-century American women writers
University of California, San Diego alumni
University of Denver alumni
Vanderbilt University alumni
Candidates in the 2022 United States Senate elections